Wu Chin-chih (born 20 May 1949) is a Taiwanese politician.

Education
Wu attended National Chengchi University.

Political career
Wu served on the Taipei County Council from 1986 to 1990, when he was elected mayor of Banqiao. Wu stepped down at the end of his second mayoral term to run for a legislative seat, which he relinquished in 2002. During his second stint in the Legislative Yuan, from 2005 to 2008, Wu was backed by the People First Party. By 2008, during his third term, Wu had rejoined the Kuomintang.

References

1949 births
Living people
New Taipei Members of the Legislative Yuan
Kuomintang Members of the Legislative Yuan in Taiwan
Members of the 4th Legislative Yuan
Members of the 6th Legislative Yuan
Members of the 7th Legislative Yuan
National Chengchi University alumni
Mayors of places in Taiwan
People First Party Members of the Legislative Yuan
New Taipei City Councilors